Destiny's Trump Card is a 1915 American silent short film directed by and starring  William Garwood in the lead role with Violet Mersereau.

External links

American black-and-white films
American silent short films
1915 films
1910s American films